Faceville is an unincorporated community and census-designated place in Decatur County, Georgia, United States.

It first appeared as a CDP in the 2020 Census with a population of 136.

Demographics

2020 census

Note: the US Census treats Hispanic/Latino as an ethnic category. This table excludes Latinos from the racial categories and assigns them to a separate category. Hispanics/Latinos can be of any race.

Notable person
Jack Thomas Brinkley, U.S. Representative from Georgia from 1967 to 1983

References

Unincorporated communities in Decatur County, Georgia
Unincorporated communities in Georgia (U.S. state)